The Van Polanen family are a noble family that played an important role in the Netherlands during the Middle Ages. By inheriting the vast properties of the Polanen family, the House of Nassau in 1403 became a landowner in the Netherlands for the first time.

History
The van Polanen family were a side branch of the van Wassenaer family which owned Kasteel Duivenvoorde since 1226. The branch took its name from Kasteel Polanen, a castle situated in Monster which was destroyed in 1351 and finally demolished in 1394.

Philips III van Duivenvoorde received the fief of Polanen in 1295. Willem van Duvenvoorde (1290-1353) purchased Oosterhout in 1324, together with vast properties around Breda and Bergen op Zoom, among them De Lek and Schoonenburg Castle (abandoned around 1450). The ruins of Kasteel Strijen, his possible residence, are still preserved in Oosterhout. Philips' son Jan I van Polanen, received the fief of Breda in 1339, together with his son John II who built a new castle there.

All of these properties were inherited by Johanna van Polanen who married Engelbert I of Nassau. Through this marriage the House of Nassau first gained territories in the Netherlands. Much later this fact, among others, led to the House of Orange-Nassau's rise to the ruling dynasty of the country.

Family Tree
 Philips III van Duivenvoorde (c. 1248 - after 1301)
 Jan I van Polanen (-1342)  m. Katherina van Brederode (-1372) 
 Dirk van Polanen  m. Elburg van Asperen
 Otto van Polanen  m. Johanna van Voorst 
 Elburg van Polanen m. Johan van Langerak 
 Cunegonda van Polanen m. Frederik van Hekeren genaamd van Rechteren 
 Jan van Polanenm.1 Elburg van Langerak m.2 Katharina von Gemen (-1493) 
 Philips van Polanen (-1375) m. Elisabeth van der Maele
 Elisabeth van Polanen(-1404) m. Hugo van Heenvliet (-1409)
 Johan II van Polanen (-1378)m.1 Oda van Hoorne (-1353) m.2 Machteld bastard of Brabant (-1366) m.3 Margareta zur Lippe 
 Johan III van Polanen (-1394)m. Odilia von Salm  (-1428) 
 Johanna van Polanen (1392-1445) m. Engelbert I of Nassau (-1442) 
 Oda van Polanen (-1417)m. Hendrik III van Montfoort (1402)
 Hendrik van Polanen(-1427)m. 1 Johanna de Ghistelles m.2 Adelaide van Stalle
 Dirk van Polanenm. Gillisje van Cralingen
 Beatrix van Polanen m. Hendrik VIII van Boutershem
 Maria van Polanen m. Willem van Cronenburch
 Otto van der Leck (-1428) m. Sophia van den Bergh (-1412)
 Willem II van Polanen (1404-1465) m. Lutgardis von Bentheim (-1445)

Literature
 Detlev Schwennicke, Europäische Stammtafeln Band XXVIII (2012) Tafel 152.